The 2014 NASCAR Camping World Truck Series was the 20th season of the Camping World Truck Series, the third highest stock car racing series sanctioned by NASCAR in North America. The season was contested over twenty-two races, beginning with the NextEra Energy Resources 250 at Daytona International Speedway and ending with the Ford EcoBoost 200 at Homestead-Miami Speedway. Toyota entered as the reigning Manufacturers' Champion, while Matt Crafton entered as the defending Drivers' Champion, and ended the season with his second consecutive title.

Teams and drivers

Complete schedule

Limited schedule

Notes

Schedule

The final calendar was released on October 25, 2013, containing 22 races. Rockingham Speedway has been removed from the schedule due to financial issues, while the second race at Iowa Speedway has also been dropped. Gateway Motorsports Park will return to the schedule for the first time since 2010, and New Hampshire Motor Speedway will also feature in the schedule for the first time since 2011. Fox Sports 1 will air all of the races except for Talladega which will air on FOX, which makes a return to airing the Truck Series for the first time since 2009.

Results and standings

Races

Drivers' standings

(key) Bold - Pole position awarded by time. Italics - Pole position earned by final practice results or rainout. * – Most laps led.

Owners' championship (Top 15)

Manufacturers' championship

See also

2014 NASCAR Sprint Cup Series
2014 NASCAR Nationwide Series
2014 NASCAR K&N Pro Series East
2014 NASCAR K&N Pro Series West
2014 NASCAR Whelen Modified Tour
2014 NASCAR Whelen Southern Modified Tour
2014 NASCAR Canadian Tire Series
2014 NASCAR Toyota Series
2014 NASCAR Whelen Euro Series

References

NASCAR Truck Series seasons